Rawlins High School is a public high school in Rawlins, Wyoming, United States. Rawlins High School is part of Carbon County School District #1.

Notable alumni
Clarence Addison Brimmer, Jr. (1922-2014), judge of the United States District Court for the District of Wyoming from 1975 to 2013
Lillian Heath (1865–1962), the first female doctor in Wyoming.
George R. Salisbury, Jr., Class of 1937; rancher in Carbon County; member of the Wyoming House of Representatives, 1975-1986
Larry Wilcox (born 1947), actor and star of NBC television show "CHiPs"

References

External links
High School website
School District website

Public high schools in Wyoming
Schools in Carbon County, Wyoming
Rawlins, Wyoming